Vemulawada is a temple town in Karapa Mandal, East Godavari, Andhra Pradesh. It is close to Daksharamam. 

Vemulawada is a village In Karapa  mandal(Tahasil/division)  of East Godavari District, in Andhra pradesh. It is located 13 KM towards west from the Port city of Kakinada, which is the district headquarters, and it is at a distance of  4 KM from  Karapa, the Mandal headquarters. Nearby towns are Kakinada to the east and Samarlakota  to  the west. The Karapa mandal is adjacent to the Samarlakota  Mandal. The village is located close to the natural drain Tulyabhaga or Jamadagni and in close proximity to the Temple (Bhimeswara Temple) town of Drakshramam close to river Godavari in East Godavari District of Andhra Pradesh. The famous temple of Sri Chalukya Kumararama in which the deity Sri Bhimeswara Swamy is worshipped, is well known and is considered as one of the ‘Pancharama Kshetras’.  The temple is at a distance of one KM from the Samarlakota( which is also called Samalkota)  railway station.  Details of the temple are available in the following Wikipedia articles -1 . Pancharama Kshetras, 2. Kumararama,  3. Samalkot, 4. Temples of Andhra Pradesh. 

Vemulavada of East Godavari district and its famous temple are often confused with another town also called  Vemulavada (originally Lemulawada or Lembulawada) in Karimnagar district of the State of Telangana and the Sri Rajarajeswara Swamy  temple available there, in many web sites.

References

External links

Cities and towns in East Godavari district